is a Japanese voice actress represented by Arts Vision. She graduated from the Japan Narration Performance Institute.  She voiced Chihiro Komiya in Shōnen Maid, Tōru Mutsuki in Tokyo Ghoul:re, Daigo Shigeno in Major 2nd and Abigail Jones in Great Pretender.

Filmography

Television animation

OVA/Film

Video games
2017
 Fire Emblem Heroes as CLARISSE, Lieu
 Exile Election  as YURI HIMENO

2018
 Dragalia Lost as CHILD RANZAL

2019
 AI: The Somnium Files as OTA MATSUSHITA

2021
 World's End Club as kansai
 Azur Lane as 

2022
 Shadowverse as Itsurugi
 Made in Abyss: Binary Star Falling into Darkness as Raul

2023
 Final Fantasy XVI as Joshua Rosfield
Uma Musume Pretty Derby as Katsuragi Ace

Dubbing

Live-action
Annika, Morgan (Silvie Furneaux)
Malignant, CST Winnie (Ingrid Bisu)
Peter Rabbit 2: The Runaway, Liam (Owen Beamond)
West Side Story, Maria (Rachel Zegler)

Animation
Elliott from Earth, Elliott

References

External links
 Official agency profile 
 
 

Living people
Japanese video game actresses
Japanese voice actresses
Voice actresses from Shizuoka Prefecture
Year of birth missing (living people)